"Vikings of the Gloves" is a Sailor Steve Costigan short story by Robert E. Howard.  It was originally published in the February 1932 issue of Fight Stories.  It was reprinted under the title "Including the Scandinavian!" after Howard's death and attributed to the Fight Stories housename "Mark Adam". Howard earned $65 for the sale of this short story.

The story follows Costigan's participation in a "Scandinavians Only" boxing match in Japan and the complications that arise.

Plot

Having docked in Yokohama and looking for a boxing match to raise money, Costigan and the crew of the Sea Girl find that the only fight club in town is booked up with Swedes vs. Danes matches because the whaling fleet is in port as well.  Luck seems to come, however, when the Swedish sailor Dirck "The Gotland Giant" Jacobsen breaks his wrist and a replacement is needed quickly for the match against the Danish sailor Hakon Torkilsen that night.

The crew try to pass of Costigan as a Swede called Lars Ivarson.  The club owner does not believe the ruse but has no other option.  The fight goes ahead, although the crowd is unconvinced as well.  Further complications soon arise.  The first complication is that the match referee turns out to be a man Costigan knocked out earlier in the day for attempting to kick his dog Mike.  He knows who Costigan is and tells him he'll reveal everything at the end of the match, at which point the crowd will turn on Costigan for intruding on a Scandinavian matter. The second complication emerges soon after the match starts.  A rival captain got the Sea Girl's captain drunk and tricked him into betting the Sea Girl on Hakon Torkilsen to win and signing a contract as proof.  Despite the captain's pleas, Costigan refuses to throw the fight, both for himself, for his ship mates who have bet everything on him, and for the Swedes that he is now representing.

The fight continues regardless and Hakon turns out to be an equal for Costigan.  The complications distract Costigan and render his performance uneven. He is knocked down several times. The problem of the bet is resolved when the rival captain, Gid Jessup, gets too near the ring while Costigan has almost been knocked out of it.  Costigan grabs the contract, the only proof of the bet, and begins to eat it.  Jessup tries to retrieve it, but Swedes in the audience, thinking he is trying to interfere with their boxer, attack him.  Free of that problem, Costigan decides to fight to the finish regardless of the referee's threat.  This too is solved quite soon after when, in the confusion of the fight, the referee accidentally starts to count Costigan out in Spanish (having only used Swedish, Danish and Norwegian so far).  Costigan realises that he isn't Scandinavian, either, and the referee admits that he is an American vaudeville linguist called John Jones who took the job because he needed the money.

Costigan and Hakon fight savagely but Hakon eventually collapses in a corner and cannot get up again.  The Swedish captain celebrates with Costigan and, after the match they have seen, does not mind that he clearly is not one of his countrymen.

Publication history
Vikings of the Gloves was first published in the February 1932 issue of the pulp magazine Fight Stories.  Since that time it has been reprinted in these publications:

 Fight Stories, Fall 1940, retitled as "Including the Scandinavian!" and attributed to the housename "Mark Adam"
 The Howard Review #2, March 1975
 REH Fight Magazine #3, September 1991
 Waterfront Fists and Others, 2003
 Waterfront Fists and Others, 2004
 Boxing Stories, 2005

The story is now in the public domain.

References

External links

 List of stories and publication details at Howard Works

Short stories by Robert E. Howard
Pulp stories
1931 short stories
Short stories about boxing
Works originally published in Fight Stories